"What's Easy for Two Is Hard for One" (also known as "What's Easy for Two Is So Hard for One") is a song written and produced by Smokey Robinson and released as a single by singer Mary Wells for the Motown label.

Song information
In this song, the narrator is longing for a longtime partnership with a suitor and constantly begs the man to "take her to the preacher man" in hopes the couple does "what should be done" because "what two can easily do is so hard to be done by one".

Release and reaction
Released in mid-1963, the song returned Wells to the top 30 where it peaked at number 29 on the Billboard Hot 100 (and #8 R&B). Wells covered the song at least two more times.

Covers
"What's Easy for Two Is Hard For One" is one of the most covered Motown songs within the company.
 The Temptations recorded a version in 1965. Remained unreleased until 1999.
 The Marvelettes recorded a version in 1966. It was released in 1968 (#114 U.S. Pop).
 Connie Haines released a version in 1966.
 Barbara Randolph recorded a version in 1966.
 Lulu recorded a version for Decca Records in 1964.
 The Intruders recorded a version for their 1974 album, Energy of Love.

Personnel

Mary Wells' version
Lead vocals by Mary Wells
Backing vocals by The Andantes: Jackie Hicks, Marlene Barrow, and Louvain Demps
Instrumentation by The Funk Brothers

Temptations' version
Lead vocals by Paul Williams
Backing vocals by Eddie Kendricks, David Ruffin, Otis Williams, and Melvin Franklin
Instrumentation by The Funk Brothers

Connie Haines' version
Lead vocals by Connie Haines
Backing vocals by The Andantes
Instrumentation by The Funk Brothers and the Detroit Symphony Orchestra

Marvelettes' version
Lead vocals by Wanda Young
Backing vocals by The Andantes
Instrumentation by The Funk Brothers

References

1963 singles
Mary Wells songs
The Marvelettes songs
Songs written by Smokey Robinson
Motown singles
Song recordings produced by Smokey Robinson
1963 songs